The Jeffery–Cyril Historic District is a national historic district in the South Shore neighborhood of Chicago, Illinois. The district comprises a cluster of six apartment buildings on Jeffery Boulevard, 71st Place, and Cyril Avenue. All six buildings were built between 1927 and 1929. Apartments had become a popular housing choice for middle-class families by the 1920s, when South Shore was developed; due to zoning restrictions, however, the district is the only large group of apartments in the neighborhood. The apartments reflect the diversity of late 1920s architecture; in fact, while architect Paul F. Olsen designed three of the buildings, he used a different style for each of them. Five of the buildings use revival styles, which were popular at the time, with examples of Georgian Revival, Gothic Revival, Spanish Colonial Revival, and Tudor Revival designs; the remaining building features the then-emerging Art Deco style.

The district was added to the National Register of Historic Places on May 5, 1986.

References

Residential buildings on the National Register of Historic Places in Chicago
Historic districts in Chicago
Apartment buildings in Chicago
Art Deco architecture in Illinois
Georgian Revival architecture in Illinois
Gothic Revival architecture in Illinois
Spanish Colonial Revival architecture in Illinois
Tudor Revival architecture in Illinois